M. Meenakshi Sundaram was an Indian politician and former Member of the Legislative Assembly of Tamil Nadu. He was Ex district secretary of Nagapattinam, He was elected to the Tamil Nadu legislative assembly as a Dravida Munnetra Kazhagam candidate from Vedaranyam constituency in 1971, 1977 and 1984 elections.  He was a floor president for Nagapattinam south DMK.

References 

Dravida Munnetra Kazhagam politicians
Living people
Year of birth missing (living people)
Tamil Nadu MLAs 1985–1989